Opostegoides nephelozona is a moth of the family Opostegidae. It was described by Edward Meyrick in 1915. It is known from Maskeliya, Sri Lanka.

References

Opostegidae
Moths described in 1915